The 2010–11 season was Alloa Athletic's eighth consecutive season in the Scottish Second Division, having been relegated from the Scottish First Division at the end of season 2002–03. Alloa also competed in the Challenge Cup, League Cup and the Scottish Cup.

Summary
Alloa finished ninth in the Second Division, entering the play-offs losing 2–1 to Annan Athletic on aggregate and were relegated to the Third Division. They reached the first round of the Challenge Cup, the second round of the League Cup and the fourth round of the Scottish Cup.

Management
They started season 2010–11 under the management of Allan Maitland. On 7 May 2011, Maitland was sacked by the club. Players Scott Walker and Brown Ferguson took over as caretaker managers for the play-offs.

Results and fixtures

Scottish Second Division

Second Division play-offs

Scottish Challenge Cup

Scottish League Cup

Scottish Cup

League table

References

2010andndash;11
Alloa Athletic